Aigoneia, also Aigone (Αἰγώνη), was a town in Malis in ancient Thessaly. It was mentioned by Lycophron and Stephanus of Byzantium. Its site has not been located.

References

Populated places in ancient Thessaly
Former populated places in Greece
Malis (region)
Lost ancient cities and towns